Dual Air Density Explorer was a set of 2 satellites, DADE-A and DADE-B, released as part of NASA's Explorer program. DADE-A and DADE-B was launched on 6 December 1975 at 03:35:01 UTC, by a Scout F-1 launch vehicle from Space Launch Complex 5, Vandenberg Air Force Base, California. The launch of the DADE satellites failed.

Spacecraft 
The Dual Air Density Explorer-A (DADE-A) satellite was a  rigid sphere designed to determine, in conjunction with Dual Air Density Explorer-B (DADE-B), the vertical structure of the 
upper thermosphere and the lower exosphere as a function of latitude, season, and local solar time. Both satellites would have been launched by a single Scout launch vehicle into coplanar polar orbits. Measurements of atmospheric density from DADE-A would have been obtained from satellite drag analyses near perigee (apporximately ) and from composition measurements taken by an onboard mass spectrometer. DADE-A was equipped with a radio beacon to facilitate tracking.

Experiments

Atmospheric Composition Mass Spectrometer 
The mass spectrometer experiment on DADE-A was designed to perform composition measurements in the upper thermosphere (approximately ). The instrument was a magnetic mass spectrometer with a Mattauch-Herzog geometry and would have measured the distribution of such atmospheric constituents as oxygen, nitrogen, helium, hydrogen, neon and argon.

Atmospheric Drag Density 
The atmospheric drag density experiment on DADE-A was designed to provide indirect measurements of upper thermospheric density near satellite perigee (approximately ). The experiment had no unique onboard hardware. The density values would have been derived from sequential observations of the satellite's position. The experiment would have yielded systematic values of atmospheric density as a function of latitude, season, and local solar time.

See also 

 Explorer 39
 Explorer 55
 Explorer program
 International Sun-Earth Explorer 1

References

External links 
 DADE A

Spacecraft launched in 1975
Explorers Program
Satellite launch failures